Lophotus is a genus of crestfishes with these currently recognized species:
 Lophotus capellei Temminck & Schlegel, 1845 (North Pacific crestfish or unicornfish)
 Lophotus guntheri R. M. Johnston, 1883 (crested bandfish)
 Lophotus lacepede Giorna, 1809 (crested oarfish)

References

Lophotidae